The Alento is a river in Italy. It is located in the Abruzzo region of southern Italy. Its source is located in Maiella National Park in the province of Pescara.

Geography
Originated in the municipality of Serramonacesca, in the province of Pescara, the river crosses the border into the province of Chieti and flows through the municipalities of Roccamontepiano, Casalincontrada, Bucchianico, Chieti, Ripa Teatina and Francavilla al Mare. Its mouth is on the Adriatic Sea, in the middle of Francavilla.

References

External links

Rivers of the Province of Pescara
Rivers of the Province of Chieti
Rivers of Italy
Adriatic Italian coast basins